The Germany men's national artistic gymnastics team represents Germany in FIG international competitions.

History
At the Olympic Games Germany has made fourteen appearances in the men's team competition, three of which were technically under the United Team of Germany.

Current senior roster

Team competition results

Olympic Games

Before WWII 
 1912 – 5th place
 Wilhelm Brülle, Johannes Buder, Walter Engelmann, Arno Glockauer, Walter Jesinghaus, Karl Jordan, Rudolf Körner, Heinrich Pahner, Kurt Reichenbach, Johannes Reuschle, Carl Richter, Hans Roth, Adolf Seebaß, Eberhard Sorge, Alexander Sperling, Alfred Staats, Hans Werner, Martin Worm
 1920 – did not participate
 1924 – did not participate
 1928 – did not participate
 1932 – did not participate
 1936 –  gold medal
 Alfred Schwarzmann, Konrad Frey, Matthias Volz, Willi Stadel, Franz Beckert, Walter Steffens, Innozenz Stangl, Ernst Winter

After WWII 
 1948 – banned from participating 
 1952 – 4th place
 Helmut Bantz, Adalbert Dickhut, Jakob Kiefer, Friedel Overwien, Hans Pfann, Alfred Schwarzmann, Erich Wied, Theo Wied
 1956 – 5th place (competed as United Team of Germany)
 Helmut Bantz, Jakob Kiefer, Robert Klein, Hans Pfann, Erich Wied, Theo Wied
 1960 – 7th place (competed as United Team of Germany)
 Karlheinz Friedrich, Siegfried Fülle, Philipp Fürst, Erwin Koppe, Günter Lyhs, Günter Nachtigall
 1964 –  bronze medal (competed as United Team of Germany)
 Siegfried Fülle, Philipp Fürst, Erwin Koppe, Klaus Köste, Günter Lyhs, Peter Weber
 1968 through 1988 — participated as East Germany and West Germany

After reunification 
 1992 – 4th place
 Ralf Büchner, Mario Franke, Sylvio Kroll, Sven Tippelt, Oliver Walther, Andreas Wecker
 1996 — 7th place
 Andreas Wecker, Valery Belenky, Jan-Peter Nikiferow, Oliver Walther, Karsten Oelsch, Uwe Billerbeck, Marius Toba
 2000 — 10th place
 Jan-Peter Nikiferow, Dimitrij Nonin, Sergej Pfeifer, Marius Toba, Rene Tschernitschek, Andreas Wecker
 2004 — 8th place
 Thomas Andergassen, Matthias Fahrig, Fabian Hambüchen, Robert Juckel, Sven Kwiatkowski, Sergei Pfeifer
 2008 — 4th place
 Thomas Andergassen, Philipp Boy, Fabian Hambüchen, Robert Juckel, Marcel Nguyen, Eugen Spiridonov
 2012 — 7th place
 Philipp Boy, Fabian Hambüchen, Sebastian Krimmer, Marcel Nguyen, Andreas Toba
 2016 — 7th place
 Andreas Bretschneider, Lukas Dauser, Fabian Hambüchen, Marcel Nguyen, Andreas Toba
 2020 — 8th place 
 Lukas Dauser, Nils Dunkel, Philipp Herder, Andreas Toba

World Championships

 1934 –  bronze medal
 1954 – 4th place
 1962 through 1989 — participated as East Germany and West Germany
 1991 –  bronze medal
 Sylvio Kroll, Andreas Wecker, Ralf Büchner, Mario Franke, Jan-Peter Nikiferow, Andre Hempel
 1994 – 5th place
 Valeri Belenki, Uwe Billerbeck, Jan-Peter Nikiferow, Marius Toba, Oliver Walther, Andreas Wecker, Mario Franke
 1997 — 6th place
 Valeri Belenki, Uwe Billerbeck, Daniel Farago, Sergei Charkov, Dimitrij Nonin, Sergej Pfeifer
 2006 — 7th place
 Fabian Hambüchen, Thomas Andergassen, Robert Juckel, Philipp Boy, Marcel Nguyen, Eugen Spiridonov
 2007 —  bronze medal
 Fabian Hambüchen, Eugen Spiridonov, Robert Juckel, Marcel Nguyen, Thomas Angergassen, Philipp Boy
 2010 —  bronze medal
 Philipp Boy, Fabian Hambüchen, Thomas Taranu, Evgenij Spiridonov, Sebastian Krimmer, Matthias Fahrig
 2011 — 6th place
 Philipp Boy, Marcel Nguyen, Fabian Hambüchen, Sebastian Krimmer, Eugen Spiridonov, Thomas Taranu
 2014 — 8th place
 Andreas Bretschneider, Lukas Dauser, Fabian Hambüchen, Helge Liebrich, Andreas Toba, Daniel Weinert
 2015 – 9th place
 Andreas Bretschneider, Fabian Hambüchen, Philipp Herder, Sebastian Krimmer, Marcel Nguyen, Andreas Toba
 2018 — 10th place
 Lukas Dauser, Philipp Herder, Nick Klessing, Marcel Nguyen, Andreas Toba
 2019 — 12th place
 Lukas Dauser, Philipp Herder, Nick Klessing, Karim Rida, Andreas Toba
 2022 — 9th place
 Lukas Dauser, Nils Dunkel, Pascal Brendel, Andreas Toba, Glenn Trebing

Junior World Championships
 2019 — 8th place
 Arne Nicolai Halbisch, Nils Matache, Valentin Zapf

Most decorated gymnasts
This list includes all German male artistic gymnasts who have won at least two medals, at least one being individual, at the Olympic Games and the World Artistic Gymnastics Championships combined.  Only included are medals won as a Unified or United Germany; not included are medals won as part of East Germany or West Germany.

See also 
 German Artistic Gymnastics Championships
 Germany women's national gymnastics team
 List of Olympic male artistic gymnasts for Germany

References 

Gymnastics in Germany
National men's artistic gymnastics teams
Gymnastics